Omorgus augustae is a species of hide beetle in the subfamily Omorginae.

References

augustae
Beetles described in 1891